El Muerto is a Spanish term that translates as "The Dead One". It may refer to:

Comics
El Muerto: The Aztec Zombie, an independent comic book character created by Javier Hernandez
El Muerto (DC Comics), a DC Comics superhero and crime-fighter stationed in Mexico City
El Muerto (Marvel Comics), a Marvel Comics character in Spider-Man comics

Film
El Muerto (2007 film), a 2007 film adaptation of the independent comic book starring Wilmer Valderrama
El Muerto (2024 film), an upcoming 2024 film based on the Marvel Comics character, produced by Sony

Other uses
Dia de los Muertos, holiday celebrated in several Latin American countries serving as a remembrance of the Dead
Pan de Muerto, type of bread baked during the Dia de los Muertos season
Caja de Muertos, Puerto Rico, island south of Puerto Rico
Cerro El Muerto, mountain peak in the Andes on border of Argentina and Chile (21,457 feet high)
Jornada del Muerto, ("Journey of the Dead Man"), name given by Spanish conquistadors to a desert basin route from New Spain (Mexico) to northern New Mexico
Los Toreros Muertos, Spanish speaking musical group
Metro Barranca del Muerto, train station on the Mexico City Metro

See also
Muerto (disambiguation)